ENOX2 is a gene located on the long arm of the X chromosome in humans. The gene encodes the protein Ecto-NOX disulfide-thiol exchanger 2, a member of the NOX family of NADPH oxidases.

Ecto-NOX disulfide-thiol exchanger 2 is a growth-related cell surface protein. It was identified because it reacts with the monoclonal antibody K1 in cells, such as the ovarian carcinoma line OVCAR-3, also expressing the CAKI surface glycoprotein. The encoded protein has two enzymatic activities: catalysis of hydroquinone or NADH oxidation, and protein disulfide interchange. The two activities alternate with a period length of about 24 minutes. The encoded protein also displays prion-like properties. Two transcript variants encoding different isoforms have been found for this gene.

Gene Location 
The human ENOX2 gene is located on the long (q) arm of the X chromosome in humans, at region 2 band 6 sub band 1, from base pair 130,622,330 to 130,903,317 (build GRCh38.p7) (map). The gene is conserved in chimpanzee, Rhesus monkey, dog, mouse, rat, chicken, and zebrafish.

Function 
ENOX2 and related NOX proteins exhibit two distinct oscillating functions: the oxidation of NADH to NAD+ and a protein disulfide isomerase-like activity, unprecedented in the biochemical literature. Regarding NADH oxidation, the protein has a specific activity of 10-20μmol/min/mg of protein with a turnover number of 200-500. The oscillations are independent of temperature, with a period of 24 minutes, completing 60 cycles in a 24-hour day. The period of oscillation changes to 22 and 26 minutes in the cancer related (tNOX) and age-related (arNOX) forms respectively. This regular oscillation is attributed to the maintenance of biological clock

Interactions 
NADH activity of ENOX2 has been shown to be stimulated by various hormones and growth factors, including insulin, EGF, transferrin, lactoferrin, vasopressin and glucagon. This stimulation is not seen in protein samples recovered from cancer cells, suggesting the regular NADH oxidase activity of ENOX2 is decoupled in cancer. ENOX2 also has a number of protein-protein interactions, with ENOX1 and SOX2, among others.

Cell Growth 
Numerous studies in the 1990s correlated NADH oxidase activity with cell growth. Conditions which stimulated cell growth also stimulated NADH oxidase activity and conditions that inhibited cell growth inhibited NADH oxidase activity. Further experimental evidence showed that the rate of cell enlargement oscillates within the 24 minute oscillation of ENOX function. Maximum cell growth rates correspond to the portion of the ENOX cycle involved in protein dulsulfide bridge formation. Theories suggest that ENOX is responsible for the breakup and formation of disulfide bonds in membrane proteins, thus maximum cell growth coincides with maximum protein disulfide interchange activity.

Role In Disease

Cancer 
The cancer associated, drug responsive variant of ENOX, tNOX, arises as a splice variant and is found on the cell surface of human cancers. tNOX exhibits a periodicity of 22 minutes, compared to the native 24 minutes and can be inhibited by a number of anticancer drugs, without affecting the native ENOX. These properties of tNOX are being used to develop early detection and intervention mechanisms for human cancers.

See also
Ecto-nox disulfide-thiol exchanger 1

References

Further reading